Genkō may refer to:

 Genkō (first), Japanese historical era from 1321 to 1324
 Genkō (second), Japanese historical era from 1331 to 1334
 Genkō, Japanese name for Mongol invasions of Japan of 1274 and 1281